The second election to the Carmarthenshire County Council was held in March 1892. It was preceded by the 1889 election and followed by the 1895 election.

Overview of the result

The Liberals retained a strong majority which they had gained at the inaugural election in 1889, although they lost a small number of seats. The election coincided with a divisive debate over the choice of a Liberal candidate to contest the Carmarthen Boroughs constituency at the forthcoming General Election.

Boundary changes

There were no significant changes but the multi-member seats which existed in 1889, mostly in Llanelli area but also at Pembrey (Burry Port) and Whitland were replaced by single-member wards.

Candidates

Of the 51 seats, only 20 were contested, compared with a very small number of unopposed returns at the inaugural election three years previously. 32 of those elected in 1889 stood for re-election.

Of the seven retiring aldermen, only two stood as candidates at the election. Sir James Hills-Johnes contested Caio for the Conservatives while C.E. Morris, elevated to the aldermanic bench following a vacancy the previous year, was returned unopposed for his former seat at Llangunnor. Alderman Morgan Davies of Llandeilo died  shorthly before the election.

Outcome

The contested elections saw a number of closely-fought wards and the defeat of some high profile members of the previous council. These included Gwilym Evans, the chairman of the council, who was defeated in one of the new Llanelli wards by another retiring member, W.J. Wilson, and another leading Liberal, Henry Wilkins, lost by six votes to Conservative Ernest Trubshaw. Prominent Conservative, J.S. Tregoning, was also defeated at Llanelli by a large margin. At Llangeler, disputes in the woollen industry centred on Drefach Felindre predominated in a contest where the Conservative Thomas Thomas ousted the sitting member, John Lewis, a woollen manufacturer. Evans, Tregoning, Wilkins and Lewis all remained members of the council, however, as they were made aldermen.

At Caio, Sir James Hills-Johnes won the seat where he was defeated in 1889, A closely fought contest at Carmarthen saw veteran Liberal Unionist Henry Norton losing by nine votes to the Liberal candidate, John Thomas.

Notwithstanding these inividual contests, the Liberals were assured of their majority before a single vote was cast and while their position was slightly stronger than in 1889 the numbers were unchanged as two seats (one elected and one aldermanic) had been gained during the term of the previous council.

The Liberal members of the Council were criticised by local Conservative newspapers, notably the Carmarthen Journal, for allocating only one aldermanic seat to their political opponents. This contrasted to the position in neighbouring Cardiganshie, where three of the eight aldermanic seats were allocated to Conservatives. Colonel Gwynne Hughes of Glancothy, a retiring alderman, finished in tenth place in the vote and was not re-elected.

Ward results

Abergwili
Some sources state that Lloyd stood as an Unionist candidate at this election.

Bettws

Caio

Carmarthen Eastern Ward (Lower Division)

Carmarthen Eastern Ward (Upper Division)

Carmarthen Western Ward (Lower Division)

Carmarthen Western Ward (Upper Division)

Cenarth

Cilycwm

Conwil

Kidwelly

Laugharne

Llanarthney

Llanboidy

Llandebie

Llandilo Rural

Llandilo Urban

Llandovery

Llanedy

Llanegwad

Llanelly Division.1

Llanelly Division 2

Llanelly Division 3

Llanelly Division 4

Llanelly Division 5

Llanelly Division 6

Llanelly Division 7

Llanelly Division 8

Llanelly Rural, Berwick

Llanelly Rural, Hengoed

Llanelly Rural, Westfa and Glyn

Llanfihangel Aberbythick

Llanfihangel-ar-Arth

Llangadock

Llangeler

Llangendeirne

Llangennech

Llangunnor

Llanon

Llansawel

Llanstephan

Llanybyther

Mothvey

Pembrey North

Pembrey South

Quarter Bach

Rhydcymmerai

St Clears

St Ishmael

Trelech

Whitland

Election of Aldermen

In addition to the 51 councillors the council consisted of 17 county aldermen. Aldermen were elected by the council, and served a six-year term. Following the elections, the following aldermen were appointed by the newly elected council. In addition to the eight vacancies, a ninth alderman was appointed in place of the late Morgan Davies.

The following retiring aldermen were re-elected:

J. Bagnall Evans, Liberal 
Robert Scourfield, Llansteffan, Liberal 
David Evans, Llangennech, Liberal 

In addition, the folloing six new aldermen were elected:

John Lewis, Meirios Hall, Liberal (defeated candidate at Llangeler) 
Gwilym Evans, Liberal (defeated candidate at Llanelli)
D.L. Jones, Derlwyn, Liberal
R.W. Stephens, Coedybrain, Liberal
J.S. Tregoning, Iscoed, Conservative
Henry Wilkins, Liberal (defeated candidate at Llanelli)

Two retiring aldermen were elected as councillors but were not re-elected as aldermen:
Sir James Hills-Johnes, Conservative
C.E. Morris, Liberal

Two retiring aldermen were not re-elected:
Col. Gwynnne Hughes JP, Liberal
D. James, Bailibedw, Liberal

By-elections between 1892 and 1895

Myddfai by-election, 1894
George Jones, the member for Myddfai, died in March 1894. His son, J. Walter Jones, was the only candidate nominated to succeed him

References

Bibliography
 

1892
1892 Welsh local elections